Aeroflot Flight A-13 ( Reys A-13 Aeroflota) was a scheduled Soviet domestic passenger flight from Baku, Azerbaijan to Fort-Shevchenko in Kazakhstan that crashed on 18 August 1973 shortly after takeoff killing 56 of the 64 passengers and crew aboard. The Antonov An-24 had suffered an engine failure on takeoff and was attempting to return to the airport when it struck an oil rig cable at low altitude resulting in a crash. At the time, it was the second deadliest accident involving the An-24 and remains the second deadliest aviation accident in Azerbaijani history. The engine failure had been caused by the effect of continuous overheating on the performance of the blades.

Aircraft 
The aircraft involved in the accident was an Antonov An-24B registered CCCP-46435 to Aeroflot. The Antonov An-24 is a twin engine medium haul transport/passenger aircraft that was introduced in 1962. The 'B' variant of the model increased passenger capacity and modified the flaps to increase performance. CCCP-46435 entered service in 1968 and was operating under the Azerbaijan Civil Aviation Administration. At the time of the accident, the aircraft had sustained 7,374 flight hours and 5,502 pressurization cycles.

Crew 
The cockpit crew consisted of:
 Captain: Nikolai Panchenko 
 Co-pilot: Valentin Viktorovich Konokotin 
 Flight engineer: Anatoly Vasilyevich Zharov

Accident 

At 18:36 MSK on 18 August 1973, CCCP-46435 took off from Baku-Bina International Airport for an approximately  flight to the Kazakh town of Fort-Shevchenko. Weather at the time was fair with ten kilometers of visibility, and wind coming from the north. On board were sixty passengers, including eleven children, and four crew who were on their second flight of the day. As it turned, the left wingtip struck the cable of an oil rig in the Caspian Sea, shearing it off. The plane descended, striking a pipeline, before crashing near a highway at 18:51 MSK. 54 people on board were killed and eight others seriously injured including the flight's captain and flight engineer.

Conclusions 

An investigation of the crash blamed the engine failure on the degradation of the turbine blades in the engine as a result of continuous overheating. This overheating can stem from several causes including not following the correct start-up procedures, design flaws, and the inability to detect overheating by visual means or through instrument indications.

See also 

 Azerbaijan Airlines Flight 217
 Azerbaijan Airlines Flight 56
 Aeroflot Flight 3843
 Avensa Flight 358

References  

Aviation accidents and incidents in 1973
Aviation accidents and incidents in the Soviet Union
Aviation accidents and incidents in Azerbaijan
Airliner accidents and incidents caused by engine failure
A-13
1973 in the Soviet Union
Accidents and incidents involving the Antonov An-24
August 1973 events in Asia
Airliner accidents and incidents involving uncontained engine failure
20th-century disasters in Azerbaijan